Fredrik Svanbäck (born 5 December 1979) is a Finnish-Swedish football player and manager who is currently representing Croatia Helsingborg in Swedish Division 5. He last represented Landskrona BoIS in the Swedish Superettan. He signed for Helsingborgs IF in 2004 having spent all his career up to that at FF Jaro in his home town. He is a left midfielder, but has also tried the full-back position. He has been capped twice for Finland.

References

External links

1979 births
Living people
Finnish footballers
Finland international footballers
FF Jaro players
Helsingborgs IF players
Landskrona BoIS players
Veikkausliiga players
Allsvenskan players
Superettan players
Swedish-speaking Finns
Association football midfielders
People from Jakobstad
Sportspeople from Ostrobothnia (region)